Guillermo Linares is a former Democratic member of the New York State Assembly who had represented the 72nd Assembly District in Manhattan from 2015 to 2016, and previously from 2011 to 2013. He is a former New York City Council Member and a former New York City Commissioner of Immigrant Affairs.

Early life
Guillermo Linares was born on August 30, 1951, in the town of Cabrera in the Dominican Republic; he was the oldest of nine children. He shares the experiences and aspirations of immigrant New Yorkers, having left his native Dominican Republic in 1966 and joining his parents who gained residency through the 1965 immigration reform, he arrived in the East Tremont section of the Bronx, at just 14 years old.  He began to learn the English language as he finished high school, gaining a General Equivalency Diploma from Theodore Roosevelt High School. Although initially discouraged from going to college by his high school guidance counselor, Linares was encouraged by his parents, who noted that as the eldest child, he had a responsibility to obtain a college degree. Taking on jobs, such as taxi driving, in order to pay for his college education, he became an American citizen during his sophomore year of college. He is currently married to Evelyn Linares, a public school principal. They have two children, Mayra and Guillermo, as well as a granddaughter, Ava and grandson, Dylan. He has often credited his family with being critical to his successes in community activism, public office, and academia.

Public office
In 1991, Linares became the first Dominican elected to public office in New York City and tied for first in the United States with Kay Palacios. He served from 1992 to 2001 in the New York City Council. Linares also served as a member of the President's Advisory Commission on Educational Excellence for Hispanic Americans, when President Bill Clinton appointed him in 1999 as a commission chair. Linares was later appointed the NYC Commissioner of Immigrant Affairs in 2004.

In 2010 Linares was elected State Assemblyman for the 72nd District, replacing Adriano Espaillat who was elected to the State Senate. In 2012 he challenged Senator Espaillat in the Democratic Primary for New York's 31st State Senate district and lost 62-38%, after Senator Espaillat was defeated by longtime Congressman Charlie Rangel in the Democratic Primary for New York's 13th congressional district months earlier. He was replaced by former Assembly Member Gabriela Rosa.

In 2014, after Assembly Member Rosa pleaded guilty to marriage fraud and resigned, Linares announced he would run for his old seat in the 2014 election. He won a four-way Democratic Primary with 44.7% of the vote, and went on to win the general election with 91.5% of the vote. Linares was defeated for re-election in 2016 by Carmen De La Rosa after unsuccessfully running for Congress earlier in the year.

References

External links

1951 births
Living people
New York City Council members
Hispanic and Latino American New York City Council members
Democratic Party members of the New York State Assembly
Dominican Republic emigrants to the United States
American politicians of Dominican Republic descent
Hispanic and Latino American state legislators in New York (state)
21st-century American politicians